Baligashu is one of the five villages of Balikumbat Sub Division and one of thirteen villages of Ngoketunjia Division in Ngo-Ketunjia department, Northwest Region, Cameroon.

See also
Communes of Cameroon

References

Populated places in Northwest Region (Cameroon)